Flumizole is an antiinflammatory agent. More specifically, it is a nonsteroidal anti-inflammatory drug (NSAID) that acts via inhibition of the enzyme cyclooxygenase (COX).

References 

Analgesics
COX-2 inhibitors
Nonsteroidal anti-inflammatory drugs
Imidazoles
Trifluoromethyl compounds
Phenol ethers